National Highway 109K, commonly referred to as NH 109K, is a National highway connecting the city of Simli to Jauljibi in the Indian State of Uttarakhand. The Highway was Notified on 12 Feb 2021 under the Bharatmala project of Government of India.

Route 
It starts at Simli and ends at Jauljibi. The NH109K lies entirely in Uttarakhand and passes through the Districts of Chamoli, Bageshwar and Pithoragarh.

The National Highway 109K connects cities and towns of different districts as follows: Simli, Tharali,  Gwaldam, Baijnath, Bageshwar, Kapkot, Tejam, Munsiari, Madkot and Jauljibi.

Junctions 
  Terminal near Simli, Karnaprayag.
  at Bageshwar.
  Terminal near Jauljibi.

References

External links 
NH 109K on OpenStreetMap

National Highways in Uttarakhand